Moon Eui-Jae (Hangul: 문의제, Hanja: 文儀濟; born February 10, 1975) is a retired South Korean wrestler who won two Olympic silver medals in freestyle wrestling, Men's Freestyle 76 kg at the 2000 Summer Olympics and Men's Freestyle 84 kg in Athens in 2004. In Sydney, he lost his semi-final and won the bronze medal match, but was awarded the silver medal later after the disqualification of Alexander Leipold due to a drug infraction.  He was also runner-up at the World Championships in 1998 and 2001, and was gold medalist at the 2002 Asian Games.

Sources
 Profile at FILA Wrestling Database

1975 births
Living people
Wrestlers at the 2000 Summer Olympics
South Korean male sport wrestlers
Wrestlers at the 2004 Summer Olympics
Olympic wrestlers of South Korea
Olympic silver medalists for South Korea
Olympic medalists in wrestling
Asian Games medalists in wrestling
Wrestlers at the 1998 Asian Games
Wrestlers at the 2002 Asian Games
World Wrestling Championships medalists
Medalists at the 2004 Summer Olympics
Medalists at the 2000 Summer Olympics
Asian Games gold medalists for South Korea

Medalists at the 1998 Asian Games
Medalists at the 2002 Asian Games
South Korean Buddhists
20th-century South Korean people
21st-century South Korean people